Charybdis japonica, the Asian paddle crab, is a species of swimming crab in the family Portunidae.

It occurs naturally in the waters around Japan, Korea and Malaysia, but has become an invasive species in New Zealand. It has also been recorded in the Adriatic Sea where it is rare.

References

Portunoidea
Crustaceans described in 1861
Taxa named by Alphonse Milne-Edwards